New York's 48th State Senate district is one of 63 districts in the New York State Senate. It has  been represented by Republican Patty Ritchie since 2011, following her defeat of incumbent Democrat Darrel Aubertine.

Geography
District 48 stretches along the western shore of Lake Ontario and the Canadian border, including all of Oswego and Jefferson Counties and part of St. Lawrence County. The city of Watertown and the military base Fort Drum are both located within the district.

The district overlaps with New York's 22nd and 24th congressional districts, and with the 116th, 117th, 118th, 120th, and 130th districts of the New York State Assembly.

Recent election results

2020

2018

2016

2014

2012

Federal results in District 48

References

48